Armand H P 'Akker' van der Merwe (born 17 June 1991) is a South African professional rugby union player for English Premiership side . His regular position is hooker.

Career

Youth

Although born in Vanderbijlpark, Van der Merwe grew up in George, where he played rugby for Outeniqua High School to win inclusion in the  Under-16 side for the 2007 Grant Khomo Week and their Under-18 side for the 2008 Academy Week and 2009 Craven Week competitions.

He was a regular for the  side during the 2010 Under-19 Provincial Championship competition, making thirteen appearances and in 2012, he made twelve appearances for the  side in the 2012 Under-21 Provincial Championship, scoring six tries.

Leopards

His senior debut came in 2013, when he was included in the senior  side for the 2013 Vodacom Cup competition. He also marked the occasion by scoring a try in injury time at the end of the match. Two more starts and three more substitute appearances (and one more try) followed during that competition.

His Currie Cup debut came in July 2013.

He made a further two appearances for the Leopards during the 2014 Currie Cup qualification tournament.

Lions

In April 2014, Van der Merwe was a surprise inclusion in the  touring squad for their Australian leg of the 2014 Super Rugby season.

Golden Lions

Racing 92

He joined  on a short-term deal for the start of their 2015–16 Top 14 season.

Personal

References

South African rugby union players
Living people
1991 births
People from Vanderbijlpark
Leopards (rugby union) players
Lions (United Rugby Championship) players
Rugby union hookers
Barbarian F.C. players
South Africa international rugby union players
Rugby union players from Gauteng